Carey Island (variant: Cary Island) is one of several uninhabited Canadian arctic islands located within the midsection of James Bay in Nunavut, Canada. It is situated south of Vieux-Comptoir (Old Factory).

Boatswain Bay Migratory Bird Sanctuary is nearby.

References

Islands of James Bay
Uninhabited islands of Qikiqtaaluk Region